Last One Standing or Last Ones Standing may refer to:

Film and television
 Last One Standing (Hong Kong TV series), a Hong Kong serial drama
 Last Man Standing (British TV series), broadcast in the U.S. as Last One Standing
 Last One Standing (Japanese TV series), Japanese thriller-comedy series for Netflix

Music

Albums
 The Last One Standing, by Christine Fellows (2002)
 Last One Standing (album), by I Divide (2014)
Last One Standing, by Aryn Michelle (2011)
Last One's Standing, by Ceann (2010)

Songs
 "Last One Standing" (Girl Thing song) (2000)
 "Last One Standing" (Emerson Drive song) (2004)
 "Last One Standing" (Skylar Grey song) (2021)
 "Last One Standing", by Avalon Drive (2008)
 "Last One Standing", by Cheryl from A Million Lights (2012)
 "Last One Standing", by Neil Finn from Try Whistling This (1999)
 "Last One Standing", by Nick Lachey (2011)
 "The Last One Standing", by Ladytron from Witching Hour (2005)
 "Last One Standing", by ¡Mayday! from Believers (2013)
 "Last One Standing", by Silent Civilian from Ghost Stories (2010)
 "Last One Standing", by Simple Plan from Get Your Heart On! (2011)
 "Last Ones Standing", by Example (2010)

See also
 "Last One Standing for You", a 1994 song by The Black Sorrows and Jon Stevens
 The Last Women Standing, a 2015 romantic drama film
 Last Man Standing (disambiguation)
 The Last One (disambiguation)